The Murderer with the Silk Scarf is a 1966 German-Italian crime film produced and directed by Adrian Hoven (who also appeared in the film), and starring Carl Möhner, Folco Lulli, Helga Liné and Harald Juhnke.

Plot
Peeking through a mail slot, a little girl sees her mother being murdered by a man, but she is unable to identify the killer. When the police investigate the murder, the killer decides to eliminate the little girl since he knows she is the only witness to the crime.

Cast
 Carl Möhner as Boris Garrett
 Folco Lulli as Polizeirat Erwin Moll
 Harald Juhnke as Oberinspektor Charly Fischer
 Susanne Uhlen as Claudia Sampton
 Adrian Hoven as Waldemar Fürst
 Sonja Romanoff as Wally Specht
 Helga Liné as Prisca Sampton
 Erwin Strahl as Toni Stein
 Ady Berber as Kriminalinspektor Stenzel
 Greta Zimmer as Frau Moll
 Vera Complojer as 'Tante' Blaschek
 Astrid Boner as Maria Stein
 Elisabeth Stiepl as Nachbarin Gmeiner

References

Bibliography 
 Simone Petricci. Il Cinema E Siena: La Storia, I Protagonisti, Le Opere. Manent, 1997.

External links 
 

1966 films
1966 crime films
German crime films
West German films
1960s German-language films
Films directed by Adrian Hoven
Italian crime films
Constantin Film films
Films set in Vienna
1960s German films
1960s Italian films
German-language Italian films